Karl Anthony Uchechukwu Mubiru Ikpeazu (born 28 February 1995) is an English professional footballer who plays as a forward for  club Konyaspor.

A former Reading Academy player, he joined Watford in 2013. He spent three years with the club without making a first team appearance, and instead played on loan at Crewe Alexandra, Doncaster Rovers, Port Vale, and Blackpool. He signed with Cambridge United in August 2016 and spent two seasons with the club before signing with Heart of Midlothian in April 2018. He played for Hearts as they lost the 2019 Scottish Cup final. He returned to England to sign with Wycombe Wanderers in August 2020 and then was sold on to Middlesbrough 11 months later. He joined Cardiff City on loan in January 2022. He joined Turkish club Konyaspor in August 2022.

Career

Reading and Watford
Ikpeazu was born in Harrow, London to an Igbo Nigerian father and a Ugandan mother. Ikpeazu joined Reading's academy in late 2010. He signed for Southern League Division One South & West club Didcot Town on loan in November 2011 and scored twice in three games, including the 3–1 FA Trophy win against Conference Premier team Bromley. In the 2012–13 season, his final for the under-18s, he scored 28 goals in as many games, finishing as the top scorer in the country at academy level.

He was offered a professional contract by Reading but turned it down and instead signed a three-year contract with fellow Championship club Watford in July 2013. Due to his age Watford were required to pay compensation which, after six months of negotiations, was agreed in January 2014 with the fee remaining undisclosed. The same month, having yet to make his first-team debut for Watford, Ikpeazu joined League One club Crewe Alexandra on loan until the end of the season. He made his debut at Gresty Road as a second-half substitute in a 2–1 defeat to Leyton Orient on 18 January, and scored his first goals in professional football with two goals against Bradford City three weeks later.

Ikpeazu returned to Crewe on 26 November 2014, on a loan deal until 25 January 2015. Two days later he scored in a 1–1 home draw with Doncaster Rovers. After the loan deal ended he joined Doncaster Rovers on loan. He was reported to have been viewed as a possible permanent signing by manager Paul Dickov, but returned to Watford in March after failing to impress at the Keepmoat Stadium. He then returned to Crewe on loan after manager Steve Davis admitted that he was unable to replace Ikpeazu during his absence.

Ikpeazu joined League One club Port Vale on a six-month loan in July 2015, having impressed manager Rob Page playing against the Vale for Crewe the previous season. He started the campaign as the club's main striker, and though he dropped out of the first eleven against Oldham Athletic on 29 September he came off the bench to score an equalising goal. Page was hopeful of extending the loan deal until the end of the season, as Ikpeazu was the club's top-scorer throughout the early stages of the campaign. However he lost his first-team place after being sent off against Burton Albion on 24 October as A-Jay Leitch-Smith entered the team and found a rich vein of form. Despite Ikpeazu still being the club's top-scorer his loan spell was not extended in January. He remained in League One however, as he joined Blackpool on loan until the end of the 2015–16 season. Ikpeazu was then released by Watford upon the expiry of his contract.

Cambridge United
Ikpeazu had a trial at Championship club Norwich City in July 2016, and scored in a pre-season friendly against Dereham Town. He signed a short-term contract with League Two club Cambridge United the following month. He scored his first goal for Cambridge in a 2–1 win over Newport County at Rodney Parade on 24 September, and manager Shaun Derry said he was becoming a "cult figure" at the club. On 9 January 2017, Ikpeazu scored for Cambridge in a 2–1 FA Cup third round defeat to Championship team Leeds United. On 23 February, he was ruled out of action for eight weeks with a hamstring injury. He ended the 2016–17 campaign with eight goals in 36 appearances, and underwent surgery after dislocating his shoulder at Portsmouth on 22 April.

On 9 December 2017, Ikpeazu was sent off in a 2–0 at former club Port Vale after receiving two yellow cards in the space of two minutes. In April 2018 "U's" announced that they "had tabled a series of strong and competitive packages at League Two level. However, the club can confirm that Ikpeazu has declined the offers put forward, making his desire to play at a higher level clear in each conversation".

Heart of Midlothian
Ikpeazu signed a pre-contract agreement with Scottish Premiership club Heart of Midlothian in April 2018, with a two-year contract which took effect from 1 July 2018. He said he was attracted to the club by the size of Tynecastle Park and faith shown in him by manager Craig Levein. He signed an extended contract with the club in March 2019 after stating that "I feel the love" following the club's support during a four-month injury lay-off with a broken foot. Old Firm clubs Celtic and Rangers were reported to have expressed an interest in bidding for his services. Hearts reached the 2019 Scottish Cup Final at Hampden Park, where they lost 2–1 to Celtic, with Ikpeazu replacing Steven MacLean on 78 minutes.

He lost his first-team place under Daniel Stendel by the time the 2019–20 season was halted due to the COVID-19 pandemic in Scotland. He was expected to be sold or released in the summer transfer window after club chair Ann Budge asked the playing staff to take a temporary 50% pay cut due to the pandemic.

Wycombe Wanderers
On 17 August 2020, Ikpeazu signed for newly-promoted Championship club Wycombe Wanderers on a three-year deal. Manager Gareth Ainsworth said that "we feel he's perfectly suited for the way we play" and saw him as a long-term replacement for Adebayo Akinfenwa. He scored his first goal for the "Chairboys" in 3–1 defeat by Middlesbrough at Adams Park on 2 January, as he "curled in a beautiful effort from 20-yards" for his first goal since September 2019. He recovered from an injury later in the year and went on to score six goals in 33 appearances during the 2020–21 season, including the winning goal against Bournemouth on 1 May which took Wycombe's relegation fight to the last day of the campaign. They were relegated despite beating Middlesbrough on the final day. Ikpeazu came second in the Supporters' Player of the Year vote, and his goals against Brentford and Bournemouth came second and third respectively in the goal of the season vote.

Middlesbrough
On 2 July 2021, Ikpeazu returned to the Championship to sign for Middlesbrough for an undisclosed fee, signing a three-year contract. Manager Neil Warnock said that he had tracked the players since his time at Hearts. He scored three goals in 22 games, but was not in new manager Chris Wilder's first-team plans after he signed Aaron Connolly and Folarin Balogun on loan during the January transfer window to compliment in-form forwards Josh Coburn and Duncan Watmore.

On 31 January 2022, Ikpeazu joined Championship rivals Cardiff City on loan until the end of the 2021–22 season. Steve Morison, manager of the Bluebirds, had needed a quick replacement after Kieffer Moore forced through a late move to AFC Bournemouth. Middlesbrough had wanted to offload Ikpeazu on a permanent transfer but relented with Cardiff's request for it to be a loan signing. On 2 February, he came on as a substitute against Barnsley to make his Cardiff debut and scored the winning goal in a 1–0 victory. Despite only starting one game for the Bluebirds, he made a further twelve appearances from the bench and scored a total of three goals and was a popular figure with supporters at the Cardiff City Stadium.

Konyaspor
On 13 August 2022, Ikpeazu signed with Turkish Süper Lig side Konyaspor on a free transfer with a sell-on clause.

International career
Ikpeazu was called up to the Uganda squad by Northern Irish head coach Johnathan McKinstry for two 2021 Africa Cup of Nations qualification matches in March 2020, but the games were postponed due to the COVID-19 pandemic in Uganda. McKinstry's successor, Milutin Sredojević, attempted to call him up in April 2022 but Ikpeazu wanted to stay in Wales and try and fight for his place in the Cardiff City team.

Style of play
Ikpeazu is an athletic  forward who possesses pace and power but sometimes struggles with ball control. He has said that "my strength is my strength and I have to use that but I have other aspects to my game".

Career statistics

Honours
Heart of Midlothian
Scottish Cup runner-up: 2018–19

References

External links

1995 births
Living people
Footballers from Harrow, London
English footballers
Association football forwards
Reading F.C. players
Didcot Town F.C. players
Watford F.C. players
Crewe Alexandra F.C. players
Doncaster Rovers F.C. players
Port Vale F.C. players
Blackpool F.C. players
Cambridge United F.C. players
Heart of Midlothian F.C. players
Wycombe Wanderers F.C. players
Middlesbrough F.C. players
Cardiff City F.C. players
Konyaspor footballers
Southern Football League players
English Football League players
Scottish Professional Football League players
Süper Lig players
Black British sportsmen
English people of Nigerian descent
English people of Ugandan descent
English expatriate footballers
Expatriate footballers in Turkey